Russocampus is a monotypic genus of Asian sheet weavers containing the single species, Russocampus polchaninovae. It was first described by A. V. Tanasevitch in 2004, and has only been found in Russia.

See also
 List of Linyphiidae species (Q–Z)

References

Linyphiidae
Monotypic Araneomorphae genera
Spiders of Russia